This article addresses the notion of quasiregularity in the context of representation theory and topological algebra. For other notions of quasiregularity in mathematics, see the disambiguation page quasiregular.

In mathematics, quasiregular representation is a concept of representation theory, for a locally compact group G and a homogeneous space G/H where H is a closed subgroup.

In line with the concepts of regular representation and induced representation, G acts on functions on G/H. If however Haar measures give rise only to a quasi-invariant measure on G/H, certain 'correction factors' have to be made to the action on functions, for

L2(G/H)

to afford a unitary representation of G on square-integrable functions. With appropriate scaling factors, therefore, introduced into the action of G, this is the quasiregular representation or modified induced representation.

Unitary representation theory
Topological groups